Bunaea is a genus of moths in the family Saturniidae first described by Jacob Hübner in 1819.

Species
Bunaea alcinoe (Stoll, 1780)
Bunaea aslauga Kirby, 1877
Bunaea vulpes Oberthuer, 1916

References

Saturniinae